Brett Fancy (born 4 January 1964 in Portsmouth, Hampshire, England) is an English film, TV, and theatre actor.

Early life
Born and raised in Portsmouth, he is the son of Brian Fancy, a HMNB Portsmouth dockyard worker, and is the grandson of Ralph Newson, who was a designer on the WWII Horsa Glider. Fancy attended Horndean School near Portsmouth, known as Mark Fancy and attended Highbury College (with actor Stephen Marcus). It was while working as stage crew at the Chichester Festival Theatre, watching Sir John Mills from the wings, that he decided to become an actor. He auditioned for and attended the Guildhall School of Music and Drama in the Barbican, City of London where he was subsequently awarded the school's Gold Medal for acting.

Theatre career
Fancy has played diverse roles on stages all around England. He began his professional career by returning to the Chichester Festival Theatre in the repertory company where he had a nightly fight sequence with Donald Sinden in The Scarlet Pimpernel, directed by Nicholas Hytner. Fancy has acted on the fringe at the White Bear Theatre, King's Head Theatre and twice at the Edinburgh Festival Fringe where he took a one-man Shakespeare-based piece on the subject of Jack Cade, who was the leader of a popular revolt in 1450 during the reign of King Henry VI of England.  
Other leading roles include Bill Sykes in Oliver Twist at the Bristol Old Vic directed by Phyllida Lloyd, Dussel in The Dreams of Anne Frank at the Polka Children’s Theatre, Willy Mossop in Hobson’s Choice at the Derby Playhouse and Bob Cratchit in A Christmas Carol at Clwyd Theatr Cymru.

He has performed at the Royal National Theatre three times. He played Kevin in Single Spies (based on Anthony Blunt's role in the Cambridge Spy Ring) alongside Alan Bennett, Simon Callow and Prunella Scales; in Antony and Cleopatra with Alan Rickman, Helen Mirren and Samuel West; and in Mother Courage and Her Children playing Eilif, opposite Diana Rigg and Leslie Sharp, directed by Jonathan Kent.

TV career
Fancy's first break in television came in the late 1980s with the support of producer Leonard Lewis, on the police series Rockliffe's Babies where he played the regular character of Steve Hood, a racist rookie detective, opposite Joe McGann. He took the lead role of Sean Hooper in the LWT comedy series Square Deal written by Richard Ommanney, recorded live in front of a studio audience weekly and directed by Nick Phillips. Fancy also had regular appearances in the series Brighton Boy and Last Salute and a recurring role in EastEnders as the character Bird Meadows. His television career includes leading guest characters in many British programs including Silent Witness, Judge John Deed, Inspector Lynley Mysteries, Holby City, The Last Salute, The Vet, Doctors, Jonathan Creek, Casualty, Hustle, Luther and New Tricks

Film career
Fancy made his feature film debut being murdered by Charlton Heston as Young Tom in Treasure Island, starring a young Christian Bale and with Pete Postlethwaite. Supporting roles followed in How's Business?, Paparazzo, Crimetime and Life in the Ring.

His first major film role came in the Scottish horror picture Outpost, portraying Taktarov, a battle-worn Russian mercenary pitted against Nazi zombies in a bunker somewhere in Eastern Europe, appearing alongside Ray Stevenson, Julian Wadham, and Richard Brake.

In 2011, director John Hay cast Fancy as the hero fireman Paul in the modern fairytale Lost Christmas opposite Jason Flemyng and starring Eddie Izzard.

In 2012, Fancy filmed in a log cabin deep in an Illinois forest, USA, in the horror comedy feature film, Kill Me Now playing a psychotic serial killer who seeks revenge against the idleness of the American teenager, alongside Michael Swaim, Beck Bennett and Kyle Mooney.

Further roles in the films Augmented, Untitled (A film), Arifa and To Olivia followed.

Brett plays Bill Starling in the film Big Boys Don’t Cry (2020). This British drama part-fictionalises the life of Paul Connolly who was abandoned in a dustbin as a two-week-old baby and then later abused at the notorious St Leonard’s children’s home in Essex. Starling a house parent at the home was jailed for 14 years in 2001 for a string of sexual assaults against children. The film was released on 23rd December 2022 on Netflix reaching number 3 in the top ten films.

External links
 

English male film actors
English male television actors
Male actors from Portsmouth
1964 births
Living people